Sierra-Plumas Joint Unified School District is a public school district based in Sierra County, California, United States. The Sierra-Plumas Joint Unified School District serves all of Sierra County and the eastern quarter of Plumas County, with headquarters in Loyalton. The District is governed by a five-person Governing Board, each member of which represents a defined geographical area of the District. The District Governing Board also serves as the Sierra County Board of Education.

The district was formed in 1954 by amalgamation of districts including the Sierra Valley Joint Union High School District, formed in 1908 out of ten school districts in the region and responsible for creating the first high school in Sierra County, at Loyalton; Butte School District, at Sierra City; and Alta School District, at Goodyears Bar; and the Downieville School.

References

External links
 

School districts in California
1954 establishments in California
School districts established in 1954